Sylvester Sembratovych (3 September 1836 – 4 August 1898) was the Metropolitan Archbishop of the Ukrainian Greek Catholic Church from 1885 until his death in 1898 and a Cardinal of the Catholic Church.

Life
Sylvester Sembratovych was born on 3 September 1836, in the village of Desznica, in south-eastern Poland. He studied in Vienna and in Lviv. From 1854 he moved for the academic studies in the Greek College of St. Athanasius, Rome, where he was ordained as a priest on 1 November 1860 and he obtained a doctorate in theology in 1861. He remained in Rome until 1863 when he returned to Galicia and was appointed to serve in the village of Tylicz. He worked also in Greek-Ruthenian Seminary of Lviv until 1865, when he was appointed professor of theology in the University of Lviv, an assignment he kept till 1879.

On 20 April 1879 he was consecrated auxiliary bishop of the Archeparchy of Lviv by his uncle, the Archbishop of Lviv Joseph Sembratovych. When his uncle resigned in 1882, Sylvester Sembratovych was appointed apostolic administrator. On 27 March 1885 he was formally appointed Archbishop of Lviv, i.e. the primate of the Ukrainian Greek Catholic Church, and he was enthroned on 5 May 1885. As Primate, he reformed the Basilian Monastic Order, published vernacular prayer books and held a synod in 1891.

On 29 November 1895 he was created cardinal priest by Pope Leo XIII and he was assigned the titular church of Santo Stefano al Monte Celio on 25 June 1896. He died in Lviv on 4 August 1898.

Notes

1836 births
1898 deaths
Ukrainian cardinals
Cardinals created by Pope Leo XIII
People from Jasło County
People from the Kingdom of Galicia and Lodomeria
Ukrainian Austro-Hungarians
Pontifical Greek College of Saint Athanasius alumni
Metropolitans of Galicia (1808-2005)